Noapara Metro Station is the largest station of the Kolkata Metro Line 1 situated in Noapara, Baranagar. It opened on 10 July 2013. These include four platforms with lengths of 182 meters, unlike other Kolkata Metro stations. It serves the localities of Noapara, Tobin Road and Bonhooghly. The station has 2 stories, with 6 escalators and 4 elevators. There are also 31 CCTV cameras for increased security. The Kolkata Metro owns a 147-acre depot for maintenance and storage of rakes immediate east of the station.

Station

Structure
Noapara elevated metro station is situated on the Kolkata Metro Line 1 and the Kolkata Metro Line 4 of Kolkata Metro.

Layout

Depot 

This is the oldest and biggest metro depot in India. It serves the Kolkata Metro Line 1 and will also serve Kolkata Metro Line 4 in future. This depot can hold maximum 40 rakes at a time. Newly received rakes are also tested here, and the old ones are kept here. The depot is connected to the Kolkata Chord line, so that newly manufactured rakes can directly be brought via train.

History 
It was opened in 1984. Before that, it was a Railway yard and a track extended till Texmaco Rail & Engineering manufacturing unit.

Connections

Bus
Bus route number 34C serves the station.

Auto
Noapara Metro to Bonhoogly.
Pramod Nagar to Tobin Road

See also

Kolkata
List of Kolkata Metro stations
Transport in Kolkata
Kolkata Metro Rail Corporation
Kolkata Suburban Railway
Kolkata Monorail
Trams in Kolkata
Noapara, India
List of rapid transit systems
List of metro systems

References

External links

 
 Official Website for line 1
 UrbanRail.Net – descriptions of all metro systems in the world, each with a schematic map showing all stations.

Kolkata Metro stations
Railway stations opened in 2013
Railway stations in Kolkata
Baranagar